Robert Balson Dingle (26 March 1926 - 2 March 2010) was a British theoretical physicist, known for his work on mathematical physics, condensed matter physics, asymptotic expansions, anomalous skin effect, liquid helium II, mathematical functions and integrals. He was a fellow of the Royal Society of Edinburgh (FRSE).

Education
Dingle studied at the University of Cambridge, UK (Tripos Part I 1945, Part II 1946).  He spent the year 1947-1948 at the University of Bristol where he worked under the supervision of Professors Nevill Francis Mott and Herbert Fröhlich, and then continued research in theoretical physics at the University of Cambridge under the supervision of Professor Douglas Hartree, earning the Ph.D. there in 1952.  Following research positions in Delft (Netherlands) and in Ottawa (Canada) he was appointed Reader in theoretical physics at the University of Western Australia in Perth. In June 1960 he was appointed as the first occupant of the Chair of Theoretical Physics at the University of St. Andrews, UK. In 1961 he was elected as a fellow of the Royal Society of Edinburgh (FRSE).

In later years he spent sabbatical periods in Canada, California and in Australia, and through ill-health he retired in 1987.

Research areas
Dingle’s research areas in theoretical physics in which he made significant original contributions were condensed matter physics, statistical mechanics (R.B. Dingle, The Bose-Einstein Statistics of Particles with Special Reference to the Case of Low Temperatures, magnetic and surface properties of metals, the anomalous skin effect in anisotropic metals and  semiconductors, and liquid helium II.   In mathematical physics he made major contributions in the fields of Bose-Einstein integrals, and with D. Arndt and S.K. Roy   and Fermi-Dirac integrals, Mellin transforms, Mathieu functions, and particularly in the field of asymptotic expansions, their large-order behavior and their derivation and interpretation  and the asymptotic expansions of Mathieu functions, spheroidal wave functions, Lamé functions and ellipsoidal wave functions and their eigenvalues. His extensive researches in this latter field he compiled in his monograph on asymptotic expansions (rigorous proof of Bose-Einstein condensation there on pp. 267–271).

Publications

Honours
Fellow of the Royal Society of Edinburgh (FRSE).

References

External links
Robert Balson Dingle

Fellows of the Royal Society of Edinburgh
1926 births
2010 deaths
20th-century British physicists